Inarticulata was historically defined as one of the two classes of the phylum Brachiopoda and referred to those having no hinge. The other class was Articulata, meaning articulated — having a hinge between the dorsal and ventral valves. These classifications have now been superseded, see brachiopod classification.

See also 
 Treatise on Invertebrate Paleontology — also mentions the new Brachiopoda classification system

References 

Animal classes
Obsolete animal taxa
Brachiopod taxonomy